İçərişəhər Futbol Klubu, simply known as Icheri Sheher FC or Old City FC in English, is an Azerbaijani football club based in the capital, Baku.

The club was founded on 25 July 2015.

"İçərişəhər FK" only has esports branch.

Football in Azerbaijan